C/2013 A1 (Siding Spring) is an Oort cloud comet discovered on 3 January 2013 by Robert H. McNaught at Siding Spring Observatory using the  Uppsala Southern Schmidt Telescope.

At the time of discovery it was 7.2 AU from the Sun and located in the constellation Lepus. Comet C/2013 A1 probably took millions of years to come from the Oort cloud. After leaving the planetary region of the Solar System, the post-perihelion orbital period (epoch 2050) is estimated to be roughly 1 million years.

After its discovery, there was thought to be a chance of a collision with Mars, but this possibility was excluded when its orbit was determined with about a 200 day observation arc.

All NASA Mars orbiters—including 2001 Mars Odyssey, Mars Reconnaissance Orbiter and MAVEN—as well as ESA's orbiter, Mars Express, and ISRO's orbiter, the Mars Orbiter Mission, reported a healthy status after the comet flyby on 19 October 2014. During the flyby, orbiters around Mars detected thousands of kilograms per hour of comet dust composed of magnesium, iron, sodium, potassium, manganese, nickel, chromium and zinc. The nucleus rotates once every eight hours.

Discovery 

The comet was discovered on 3 January 2013 by professional astronomer Robert McNaught at the Siding Spring Observatory at Coonabarabran NSW Australia and received the official designation C/2013 A1. It was named Siding Spring based on a tradition to identify the observatory that discovered it. Three images were obtained through the use of a CCD camera mounted on the Uppsala Southern Schmidt Telescope with a spherical mirror of 0.5 meters in diameter. Comet Siding Spring had an apparent magnitude of 18.4 to 18.6.

Precovery images by the Catalina Sky Survey from 8 December 2012 were found quickly and announced with the discovery giving Comet Siding Spring a 29-day observation arc. On 3 March 2013, Pan-STARRS precovery images from 4 October 2012 were announced that extended the observation arc to 148 days.

Encounter with Mars 

Comet Siding Spring passed extremely close to Mars on 19 October 2014 at 18:28 ± 0:01 UTC. Initial observations by Leonid Elenin on 27 February 2013, suggested that it might pass  from the center of Mars.

As seen from Mars, C/2013 A1 peaked at approximately apparent magnitude −6.

Predicted effects 

The main body of the comet's tail was projected to miss Mars by some 10 Mars diameters. As a result, only higher-than-average-velocity meteoroid dust, ejected earlier in the approach of the comet, allow for impacts on Mars, its moons, and orbiting spacecraft. Dust particles ejected from the nucleus of the comet, at more than double the expected velocity when the comet was 3 AU from the Sun, could reach Mars approximately 43 to 130 min after the closest approach of the comet. There is a possibility for millimeter- to centimeter-size particles released more than 13 AU from the Sun, however, this is considered unlikely, although massive ejections from farther out have been deduced.

In 2013 it was thought possible that Comet Siding Spring would create a meteor shower on Mars or be a threat to the spacecraft in Mars orbit. Studies in 2014 showed the threat to orbiting spacecraft to be minimal. The greatest threat would be about 100 minutes after closest approach.

The coma of the comet is projected to more than double the amount of hydrogen in the high atmosphere for a period of several tens of hours and to warm it by about 30 K for a few hours—the combination increasing the effect of atmospheric drag on the Mars Reconnaissance Orbiter and MAVEN spacecraft causing a measurable increase in orbital decay because of atmospheric ram pressure. These spacecraft will be approaching Mars to minimum altitudes of 250 km and 150 km and orbital periods of 3 and 4 hours, respectively. The amount of drag cannot be narrowed down greatly until the production rate of the comet is known, but it could be from 1.6 to 40 times normal drag. MAVEN, in particular, also has instruments to observe any changes to the gas composition of the atmosphere.

Based on early upper-limit size estimates, the resulting upper-limit energy of a hypothetical impact with Mars was 24 billion megatons. The diameter of such a hypothetical impact crater would be roughly ten times the diameter of the comet's nucleus. A 700-meter impactor would create around a  crater.

The odds of an impact with Mars were 1 in 1250 in March 2013, 1 in 2000 in late March 2013, 1 in 8000 by April 2013, and 1 in 120,000 by 8 April 2013. The 8 April 2013 JPL Small-Body Database 3-sigma solution was the first estimate to show that the minimum approach by Comet Siding Spring would miss Mars.

Actual effects 

MAVEN detected an intense meteor shower. Comet Siding Spring has a rotation period of approximately 8 hours. Debris from Comet Siding Spring added a temporary, but strong layer of ions to Mars's ionosphere (the first time such a phenomenon has been observed on any planet), and 85 tonnes of cometary dust were vaporized high in Mars's atmosphere. Magnesium, iron, and other metals were observed to have been deposited. An observer on the surface would have seen a few tens of meteors during the plane crossing.

During the flyby of Mars at a proximity of 140,000 km, Comet Siding Spring's magnetic field, generated by its interaction with the solar wind, caused a violent turmoil that lasted for several hours, long after its flyby. Its coma washed over Mars with the dense inner coma, reaching or almost reaching the planet's surface. The cometary magnetic field temporarily merged with and overwhelmed Mars'  weak magnetic field.

Observation 

As seen from Earth, on 19 October 2014, Mars was in the constellation Ophiuchus, near globular cluster NGC 6401, and 60 degrees from the Sun. As of October 2014, C/2013 A1 had an apparent magnitude of roughly 11 and was the third-brightest comet in the sky at that time. At an apparent magnitude of 0.9, Mars was estimated to be about 11,000 times brighter than the diffuse-looking comet with a low-surface brightness. To observe C/2013 A1 visually from Earth would have required a telescope with an optical mirror at least  in diameter. By November 2014 the comet had dimmed to magnitude 11.6 and was only around the fifth-brightest comet in the sky.

Mars and Comet Siding Spring were visible to the STEREO-A spacecraft during the 2014 encounter. In orbit around Mars were the spacecraft Mars Reconnaissance Orbiter, 2001 Mars Odyssey, ESA's Mars Express, MAVEN, and the Indian Mars Orbiter Mission (Mangalyaan). The last two missions had arrived less than one month before the closest approach of C/2013 A1 to Mars. All these artificial satellites may have been exposed to potentially damaging particles. The level of exposure will not be known for months, but NASA had taken several "precautionary measures" as it prepared to study C/2013 A1. Two key strategies to lessen the risk were to place the orbiters on the opposite side of Mars at the time of the highest risk and to orient the orbiters so that their most vulnerable parts were not in the line of impact. On the ground, the Curiosity and Opportunity rovers obtained images as well. Results from the observations will be discussed during a special session "Comet C/2013 A1 Siding Spring at Mars" at the 2014 AGU Fall Meeting in San Francisco on 18 December 2014.

Gallery

Before comet flyby

During comet flyby

References

External links 

 
 C/2013 A1 (Siding Spring) – Elements and Ephemeris – Minor Planet Center
 C/2013 A1 (Siding Spring) – Seiichi Yoshida @ Aerith.net
 C/2013 A1 (Siding Spring) – CometBase
 C/2013 A1 Siding Spring and Mars  – Virtual Telescope Project (19 October 2014)
 NASA – Official WebSite – Comet Siding Spring.
 NASA – VIDEO (02:19) – Overview of Comet Flyby of Mars (9 October 2014).
 NASA – VIDEO (56:15) – Press Briefing of Comet Flyby of Mars (9 October 2014).
 Comet C/2013 A1 and Mars – 80mm f4 refractor/Pentax K-5 (17 October 2014).
 Comet C/2013 A1 and Mars – 200mm f5.6 telephoto/Canon 650D (composite; 17 October 2014).
 Comet C/2013 A1 and Mars – Sormano Astronomical Observatory (19 October 2014).
 Comet C/2013 A1 passes Mars – Curiosity rover view (enlarged upper-left; 19 October 2014).
 Comet C/2013 A1 passes Mars – NASA APOD (20 October 2014).
 Comet C/2013 A1 passes Mars – Hubble Space Telescope (22 October 2014).
 Comet C/2013 A1 passes Mars – Collection of images (posted 3 November 2014).

20130103
Discoveries by SSS
20130103
20141025
20141019
2013A01
Articles containing video clips